"Clown" is a song by the Scottish recording artist Emeli Sandé. It was released on 3 February 2013 as the fifth single from her first studio album, Our Version of Events (2012). "Clown" was written by Sandé, Shahid Khan and Grant Mitchell, and produced by Khan under his production name of Naughty Boy.

Background 
The song talks about Sandé's first experiences in the music industry, mainly reflecting her search to be signed by a music company and the encounters with several music business people. Commenting on the song, Sandé said, "It’s about how I felt when I was trying to get signed, I was going for all these meetings and people were looking at me like 'What do we do with you'? It's about not allowing yourself to be judged by others or to be taken for an idiot. I feel the video reflects that."

Music video 
A music video to accompany the release of "Clown" was first released onto YouTube on 6 December 2012 with a total length of three minutes and forty-seven seconds. It was directed by WIZ. The video was made in the style of a silent film and shows Sandé being urged by a group of men, in military uniform, to sign a document in order to receive something in return. The music video takes inspiration from the 1928 silent film "Joan of Arc" as a woman is put on trial and urged by a group of men to recant her claims of belief.

Promotion 
Sandé performed "Clown" during the final of the ninth series of The X Factor on 9 December 2012, as well as appearing on The Voice of Holland in November 2012. Sandé also performed the song on The Graham Norton Show on 11 January 2013.

"Clown" debuted in Australia at #34 in the week commencing 2 June 2014 on the back of The Voice contestants Candice Skjonnemand and Thando Sikwila performing the song on the show on 26 May 2014.

Track listing 
Digital EP
 "Clown" – 3:41
 "Clown"  – 4:06
 "Kill the Boy" – 3:43
 "Clown"  – 3:41
 "Clown"  – 3:46

2013 Brit Awards
 "Clown" / "Next to Me" (Live from the BRITs) – 4:53

Credits and personnel 
 Lead vocals – Emeli Sandé
 Lyrics – Emeli Sandé, Shahid Khan, Grant Mitchell
 Producers – Naughty Boy
 Piano – Grant Mitchell
 Label – Virgin Records

Charts and certifications

Weekly charts

Year-end charts

Certifications

Release history

O'G3NE version

The Dutch three-piece girl group O'G3NE, released a cover version of the song in the Netherlands as a digital download on 23 May 2016 by Cornelis Music. The song peaked at number 64 on the Dutch Singles Chart. The song is included on the Special Edition of their third studio album, We Got This.

Track listing

Charts

Release history

References

Emeli Sandé songs
Virgin Records singles
Songs written by Emeli Sandé
2013 singles
2010s ballads
Contemporary R&B ballads
Soul ballads
2012 songs
Black-and-white music videos
Songs written by Naughty Boy